Browns Crossing is an unincorporated community in Baldwin County, in the U.S. state of Georgia.

History
Variant names were "Browns" and "Browns Station". Two of the first settlers, the postmaster and a railroad employee, had the surname Brown. A post office called Browns Crossing was established in 1877, and remained in operation until 1931.

References

Unincorporated communities in Baldwin County, Georgia
Unincorporated communities in Georgia (U.S. state)